The 2011 Leeds City Council election took place on Thursday 5 May 2011 to elect members of Leeds City Council in England. It was held on the same day as other local elections across the UK.

As per the election cycle, one third of the council's seats were up for election. The councillors subsequently elected replaced those elected when their individual seats were previously contested in 2007.

After forming a minority administration following the 2010 election, the Labour Party regained overall control of the council for the first time since the council had been in no overall control in 2004. Labour gained seven seats, including four from the Liberal Democrats.

Election summary

This result had the following consequences for the total number of seats on the council after the elections:

Councillors who did not stand for re-election

Ward results

References

2011 English local elections
2011
2010s in Leeds